Kachrylion was a potter of Greek red-figure pottery at the end of the 6th and the beginning of the 5th century BC. At his pottery had worked some of the most important Attic-Greek vase painters of these times, so Euphronios and  Oltos. He signed 29 kylixes and one plate.

References

Martin Robertson. The Art of Vase-Painting in Classical Athens. Cambridge University Press, 1992

Literature

John Beazley: Attic Red-figure Vase-painters 2nd ed. Oxford 1963, S. 107-109.

Ancient Greek potters